South Korean singer and main vocalist of SS501, Heo Young-saeng has released two studio albums, four EPs, six singles, six soundtrack contribution songs, two collaboration songs, and five DVDs.

During 2005-2010, Heo had three solo songs from SS501 albums: "Hajimete Miru Sora Datta" from Kokoro, "Is It Love?" from U R Man, and "Nameless Memory" from SS501 Solo Collection. In 2009, he contributed songs to the soundtracks for Friend, Our Legend and Will It Snow for Christmas? named "I Erase Tears" and "I Love You.. I'm Sorry.." respectively.

Heo Young-saeng's solo debut mini album, Let It Go, was released on May 12, 2011 and features "Park Joo Hyun", the main rapper of girl group Spica, on the music video, and Kim Kyu Jong and Hyuna on "Rainy Love" and "Let It Go" tracks respectively. The album peaked at number one on Gaon's album chart for the week starting on May 8, 2011. He was also featured in Kim Kyu-jong's song, "My Love" from Turn Me On album.

In 2012, Heo released his second mini-album entitled Solo in May, participating in the album's planning and production. He also went to Japan to release his first Japanese album entitled Overjoyed on September 19 under on the Pony Canyon Japan label.Overjoyed entered the Japanese Oricon weekly album charts at #29.

In 2013, Heo collaborated with Lee Jung Bong on a duet named "Goodbye My Love". He then released his third mini album Life on March 13. Before enlisting in October 2013, Heo first released two more albums,  Memories To You in Japan on July 3, and She special album in Korea on October 16. The two albums were his parting gesture to his fans before his military duties.

Studio albums

Extended plays

Singles

As featured artist

Soundtrack contributions

Video albums

Videography

Music videos

Others

Production credits

Concerts/Major Fan meetings

The following is an incomplete list of Heo Young-saeng's concerts, major fan meetings, and tours.

See also
 SS501 discography
 Kim Hyun-joong discography
 Kim Kyu-jong discography
 Park Jung-min discography
 Kim Hyung-jun discography

References

External links 
 
 
 
 
 

SS501
Discographies of South Korean artists
K-pop discographies